Lorik Maxhuni (born 2 July 1992 in Prishtinë) is a Kosovar-Albanian footballer who plays as a midfielder for KF Flamurtari in the Football Superleague of Kosovo.

References

1992 births
Living people
Sportspeople from Pristina
Association football fullbacks
Kosovan footballers
Grazer AK players
KF Drenica players
KF Trepça'89 players
KF Ferizaj players
Flamurtari Vlorë players
FC Prishtina players
KF Flamurtari players
Football Superleague of Kosovo players
Kategoria Superiore players
Kosovan expatriate footballers
Expatriate footballers in Croatia
Expatriate footballers in Austria
Expatriate footballers in Albania
Kosovan expatriate sportspeople in Croatia
Kosovan expatriate sportspeople in Austria
Kosovan expatriate sportspeople in Albania